Balwant Singh Mehta (8 February 1900 – 31 January 2003) was an Indian politician and freedom fighter who served as a Member of Constituent Assembly of India and the 1st Lok Sabha from Udaipur Lok Sabha constituency.

Personal life 
He was born on 8 February 1900 and graduated from Fergusson University. He married Sugandh Kumari at a very young age. On 4 October 1938, he was arrested and served one year in jail. He was the founder of the Pratap newspaper. He died on 31 January 2003 at the age of 103.

References 

1900 births
2003 deaths
Members of the Constituent Assembly of India
Lok Sabha members from Rajasthan
Fergusson College alumni